Transactional database may refer to:

 Operational database of customer transactions
 Database transaction - a transactional database could be one that is ACID-compliant for each database transaction
 Navigational database